The Chemelil Sports Complex is a multi-use stadium in Chemelil, Kenya.  It is used mostly for football matches, and is the home stadium of Chemelil Sugar F.C.  The stadium holds 5,000 people.

References

Football venues in Kenya
Sport in Nyanza Province